Rational AG is a German manufacturer and retailer of commercial and industrial kitchen equipment for thermal food preparation. The company is based in Landsberg am Lech, Germany, and was founded by Siegfried Meister in 1973. It operates worldwide and has 25 subsidiaries in Europe, Asia, North and South America as well as seven branches in Germany.

History  
The company was founded in 1973 by Siegfried Meister (* 1938, † 2017) with 18 employees as a company for the production and distribution of hot air appliances in Germany. These quickly superseded conventional ovens that were used in the commercial sector before then. Initially, the company produced deep fryers and ovens. In 1976, Meister invented the Rational combi steamer for commercial kitchens and started its production. From 1978 onwards, the company concentrated solely on combi steamers and discontinued all other product lines.

From 1991, Rational expanded abroad and founded its first subsidiary in the United Kingdom. In 1992, the company took over the French partner Frima. Since then, local sales companies have been established in multiple countries across the world.

In 2000, "Rational GmbH" was converted to a stock corporation. Since March 3, 2000, the company has been listed in the Prime Standard of the Frankfurt Stock Exchange.

In 2008, Rational opened its third plant in Landsberg. On March 4, 2009, the company was promoted to the MDAX. As of September 22, 2014, Rational AG was listed in the SDAX. In 2012, Peter Stadelmann joined the company and took over the business from 2014.

On August 11, 2016, Rational moved back up to the MDAX, and on September 18, 2017, the stock again moved to the SDAX. In 2018, Frima was renamed Rational and its VarioCookingCenter has since been marketed under the Rational brand.

On September 23, 2019, Rational returned to the MDAX. In April 2022, the contract of CEO Peter Stadelmann was extended until November 2027.

Company 
Rational AG has 7 national and 25 international subsidiaries in Germany, Europe, Asia, North and South America. The company is active with an export share of 87 percent.

In 2021, the company generated sales of €779.7 million and employed 2,206 people.

EBIT (earnings before interest and taxes) amounted to 160 million euros in 2021. The EBIT margin was 20.5 percent. The family of founder Meisters holds the majority of shares in the company, 55.2 percent, with 44.8 percent in public float (as of March 1, 2022).

Products 
Rational's products include the iCombi Pro and iCombi Classic combi steamers and the iVario Pro, which can replace a tipper, pan, kettle or fryer in the kitchen. The appliances can be connected and controlled via an online platform. This allows, for example, for menu plans or recipe management to be controlled digitally. The platform also contains cooking videos and a recipe library.

Combi steamers account for about 90 percent of the company's appliance sales, while sales of the iVario line account for about ten percent. The combi steamers are produced and tested at the plant in Landsberg am Lech.

References 

Engineering companies of Germany
Cooking appliance brands
Companies based in Bavaria
British Royal Warrant holders
Companies in the MDAX